General elections were held in Guam on November 4, 2014. Voters elected the governor, legislature, and territory's delegate to the United States House of Representatives. Primary elections were held on 30 August.

The Democratic and Republican primary elections were held on August 30, 2014.

Candidates for Governor

Democratic
Former Governor Carl T. C. Gutierrez. Previously served as Governor for two terms from January 2, 1995 until January 6, 2003.
Attorney Gary W. F. Gumataotao is Gutierrez running mate.

Republican
Current governor Eddie Calvo.
Current lieutenant governor Ray Tenorio is Calvo's running mate.

Candidates for Congressional Delegate

Democratic
 Madeleine Bordallo, incumbent Delegate
 Matthew Pascual Artero, current realtor from Artero Realty.

Republican
 Margaret Metcalfe, as a Republican National committeewoman.

Legislature of Guam

All fifteen seats in the Legislature of Guam are up for election. Democrats, under Speaker Judith Won Pat, currently control nine seats in the Legislature, while Republicans hold six seats. One incumbent seats and only senators is not seeking re-election was Ben Pangelinan to the 33rd Guam Legislature until he died in the office on July 8, 2014.

Attorney general candidates
Two candidates are seeking election as attorney general, Leonardo Rapadas and retiring Superior Court of Guam judge Elizabeth Barrett-Anderson.

Results

Primary results

General election results

Consolidated Commission on Utilities candidate
Eleven candidates are seeking election as CCU will take three seats.

Simon A. Sanchez II (I)
Andrew "Andy" S. Leon Guerrero
Francis E. Santos
Earl Joseph Garrido
Frederick Phil Quinene Tupaz
William "Bill" H. Hagen
Benigno Manibusan Palomo (I)
Joseph George Bamba
William "Bill" A. Payne, Jr.
Jose S. Servino
Eloy Perez Hara (I)

Guam Education Board candidate 
Nine candidates are seeking election as Guam Education Board will take six seats.

 Peter Alexis D. Ada (I)
 Joseph Cruz Santos
 Lourdes Benavente (I)
 Jose Q. Cruz (I)
 Ronald Ayuyu (I)
 Lourdes B.S. San Nicolas
 Rosie Rivera Tainatongo
 Maria A. Gutierrez (I)
 Albert T. San Agustin (I)

Judicial retention elections 
One Supreme Court Associate Justice, Robert J. Torres Jr., and one Superior Court Judge, Michael J. Bordallo, were up for retention.

General election

Governor of Guam

US House Delegate

Consolidated Commission on Utilities

Guam Education Board

Referendum

Newcomers

Attorney General
The newcomer is Elizabeth Barrett-Anderson is a former Attorney General, and she was elected on November 4, 2014.

Consolidated Commission on Utilities
There will be 2 new CCU member were elected on November 4, 2014.
 Francis E. Santos - a former Democratic Senator
 Joseph George Bamba - a former senator and chief of staff from Gov. Calvo and Camacho.

Guam Education Board
The newcomer is Lourdes San Nicolas where she was elected on November 4, 2014.

References

2014 elections in Oceania
2014
2014 in Guam
2014 referendums
2014
2014 Guam elections